"Poppin'" is the fifth single by Chris Brown produced by Dre & Vidal off his self-titled debut album, released in November 2006. In a radio interview in Miami, Florida, Brown stated that he would not be shooting a music video. The song peaked at number 42 on the Billboard Hot 100 chart. The song is included in the Stomp the Yard soundtrack.
There is a remix to the song featuring Juelz Santana and Lil Wayne. Both artists are featured on separate tracks on Chris Brown's self-titled debut album as well.

Song information
Brown sings about meeting a girl and claims that her looks "set him on fire". He is basically giving praise to the young lady's physical attributes and therefore describing her as "poppin'".

Chart performance
Poppin debuted at number 82 on the US Billboard Hot 100 chart on December 5, 2006. The song eventually peaked at number 42 on February 6, 2007 and spent a total of 20 weeks on the chart, though it was not promoted physically as a CD single. It became the first Chris Brown single to miss the top fifteen. The single was certified gold by the Recording Industry Association of America (RIAA) for sales of over 500,000 copies in the United States.

Official versions
 Poppin' (Main) - 4:25

Remix
The official remix of "Poppin'", a single off of Chris Brown's self-titled debut album, features rappers Lil Wayne and Juelz Santana.

Charts

Year-end charts

Certifications

References

2005 songs
2006 singles
Chris Brown songs
Songs written by Johntá Austin
Songs written by Andre Harris
Songs written by Vidal Davis
Jive Records singles
Song recordings produced by Dre & Vidal